Flying Solo is a young adult novel written by Ralph Fletcher, first published in 1998(first edition)

Plot
Mr. Fabiano has a substitute teacher who calls in sick on April 28. When his class arrives, they discover that their substitute teacher has not shown up. The class decides they will not report this to administration and decide to run the classroom by themselves. The students follow the instructions left by their teacher, and all goes fairly smoothly. However, at the end of the day, during a special assembly when all of the teachers are supposed to come up on stage, the class is discovered when they only had a little time left of the school day. At the end of the story, Mr. Fabiano realises that they could run the class by themselves and they go solo.

Characters
Mr. Fabiano — a handsome and beloved sixth grade teacher.
Rachel White — The de facto protagonist, Rachel has been mute for six months since a classmate (Tommy Feathers) who had a crush on her died six months earlier, the day after she told him off.
Bastian Fauvell — A sarcastic and rebellious Air Force brat. It's his last day of school before he moves to Hawaii.
Sean O'Day — A shy boy from a poor family who loves Rachel.
Karen Ballard — The natural leader of the class who was basically the teacher for the day also class president 
Jessica Cooke — The only member of the class that questions the students running the class for the day.
Christopher Ransom — An obnoxious and spoiled rich boy, that irritates most of the class.
Missy — Rachel's best friend, who is also overweight and insecure. She usually acts as Rachel's interpreter.
Rhonda - A sassy girl who is also brave and competitive.
Sky - an awkward boy from California who is a good surfer.
John - is a trouble maker boy that hangs out with Bastian and Christopher all the time.

Themes
Several of the topics explored in the novel include selective mutism, death, and grief.

Reception
Susan P. Bloom in her review for Horn Book Magazine was positive, saying "this kaleidoscopic novel is more thoughtful and poignant than most school stories, while still appropriately leavened with comic moments"; it "demonstrates an utter respect for its characters and its readers, who will appreciate the honest and uncondescending portrayals." Julie Siebecker reviewing for School Library Journal said that "the prose is economical but not sparse, and the characters are developed as sketches rather than in-depth portraits, which helps keep the book moving briskly. Not a must-have but a worthwhile purchase." Nancy J. Johnson in her review for The Reading Teacher said that "Fletcher's characters are realistic and complicated. They rely on the writing lessons Mr. Fabiano taught them to explain, understand, and uncover the challenges of growing up and facing independence."

References

External links

Ralph Fletcher's website

1998 American novels
American young adult novels
Clarion Books books